W39DE-D, virtual and UHF digital channel 39, was a low-powered television station licensed to Cayey, Puerto Rico. The station was owned by Liberty Junior College. The station's transmitter has been located on the campus.

W39DE-D's license was cancelled by the Federal Communications Commission on February 2, 2021 for failure to file a license renewal application.

References

External links

39DE-D
Low-power television stations in the United States
Television channels and stations disestablished in 2021
2021 disestablishments in Puerto Rico
39DE-D
Defunct television stations in the United States